Miss Venezuela 2018 was the 65th edition of the Miss Venezuela held on December 13, 2018 at the Estudio 5 de Venevisión in Caracas, Venezuela. At the end of the event, Miss World Venezuela 2017, Veruska Ljubisavljević, crowned Isabella Rodríguez of Portuguesa as the winner. She represented Venezuela at Miss World 2019 and made into top 40.

This was the first edition of Miss Venezuela not being under the chairmanship of Osmel Sousa, who was president for 40 years. After his resignation, the organization is now chaired by three former Venezuelan beauty queens: Gabriela Isler, Miss Universe 2013, Jacqueline Aguilera, Miss World 1995 and Nina Sicilia, Miss International 1985. This marks the second time the winner goes to the Miss World pageant instead of Miss Universe, after Martina Thorogood, Miss Venezuela 1999, represented Venezuela at Miss World 1999.

Results 
Color key

Fast Track Events 
Winners secured a place in the top ten.

Interactive Beauty Gala
The following awards were given by fan vote on missvenezuela.com and Twitter. This year, they were given during the telecast of the pageant on December 13.

Contestants 
Contestants from all 23 states and the Capital District of the country competed for the title.

References

External links
Miss Venezuela Official Website

Miss Venezuela
2018 beauty pageants
2018 in Venezuela